The Hyderabad Skykings were a professional American football team based in Hyderabad, India. They were members of the East Division in the Elite Football League of India.

Originally based in Kandy, Sri Lanka and called the Kandy Skykings, the team formally joined the league in 2011 and began play in the 2012 season.

Franchise history

Current roster

Coaches

Head coaches
Praveen kumar reddy chintala ,Hyderbad

2012 season
By the end of the regular season the Skykings were placed third in the east division.

Roster

References

External links

Elite Football League of India
American football teams in India
American football teams established in 2011
Sport in Hyderabad, India
2011 establishments in Sri Lanka